The Happy Hacking Keyboard (HHKB) is a small computer keyboard produced by PFU Limited of Japan, codeveloped with Japanese computer scientist and pioneer Eiiti Wada. Its reduction of keys from the common 104-key layout down to 60 keys in the professional series is the basis for its smaller size while retaining full key size. It returns the control key to its original position as on the early 84-key IBM Personal Computer/AT and XT layouts. The current models in production are the Happy Hacking Keyboard Professional Classic, Professional Hybrid (wired/wireless dual connectivity), and Professional Hybrid Type-S (silenced variant of Hybrid) all in either dark or light colorways, and either blank or printed keycaps. Professional Hybrid models are also available in Japanese layout.

History

Beginnings 
Frustrated that each new computer system came with a new keyboard layout that became increasingly complex, Wada sought to create his own keyboard that he could continue to use with various different computer systems. Inspired by the original Macintosh keyboard, Professor Wada and PFU collaborated to design the Happy Hacking Keyboard with the following philosophy:

During the design process, Wada had mock-ups of the keyboard both with printed and blank keycaps; he found that his students quite liked blank keycaps and the tradition of HHKB's with blank keycaps continues to this day.

The first Happy Hacking keyboard (HHKB) was released in 1996 and used membrane keyswitches. It used PS/2, Sun, and ADB interfaces to connect to a computer with a detachable cable and is only available in white. The first HHKB was followed by the release of the HHKB Lite and HHKB Lite2 in 1999 and 2001 respectively. The HHKB Lite models also used membrane keyswitches but have a slightly different layout than the standard HHKB. The HHKB Lite is the first HHKB model to be available in black and the HHKB Lite2 is the first HHKB model to use the USB interface.

HHKB Professional Series

First-generation 
The first HHKB Professional (not to be confused with the previously mentioned first HHKB) was released in December 2003 and is available in either white or charcoal (black) colorways with either blank or printed keycaps. Retroactively known as the HHKB Professional 1, this is the first HHKB model to use the famous Topre electrostatic capacitive keyswitches that all subsequent models use to this day. It also features a detachable mini-USB cable which is used to connect the keyboard to a computer.

Second-generation 
The HHKB Professional 2 was released in March 2006 and is also available in either white or charcoal (black) with either blank or printed keycaps. Its main feature is a built-in 2-port USB hub for connecting mice and other peripherals. 

In 2011, PFU released the HHKB Professional 2 Type-S. Only available in white (but with either blank or printed keycaps), the HHKB Professional 2 Type-S is a silenced variant of the HHKB Professional 2 containing silenced Topre keyswitches. 

Another variant of the HHKB Professional 2 called the HHKB Professional BT, was released in 2016. This is the first HHKB to feature Bluetooth connectivity. HHKB Professional BT models run on AA batteries housed in a "battery bump" on the rear of the keyboard and can only be connected using Bluetooth (although these models have a micro-USB port, it can only be used to power the keyboard in place of batteries and not for data transmission).

Third-generation 
The third-generation models of HHKB Professional: Classic, Hybrid, and Hybrid Type-S – were released in December 2019. These third-generation models feature 100% PBT keycaps, where previous models used ABS for the space bar. Furthermore, the third-generation models feature USB-C connectivity instead of mini-USB. HHKB Professional Hybrid models run on AA batteries housed in a "battery bump", similar to the previous HHKB Professional BT. However, unlike the HHKB Professional BT, these models can also be used with a wired connection via the USB-C port. HHKB Professional Hybrid models also support PFU's official key remapping software.

Common features 
Some of the Happy Hacking Keyboard design tenets, as dictated by Wada, include a minimal 60-key design, no cursor or function keys, and standard keyboard pitch, all optimized for use in Unix environments.

Happy Hacking Keyboards lack a numeric keypad, and keys outside the typewriter key area are mainly accessible through the Fn key. The keys are arranged in a layout resembling the Sun Type 3 keyboard. Specifically:
 The control key is placed where most keyboards place the caps lock. This is the only control key on the keyboard.
 The esc key is located to the left of the 1 key; the tilde key normally found there is at the right end of the same row.
 The delete key is located directly above the enter key; the key normally found there is the second-rightmost key on the row above it. Further, this is a true delete key, not a historically named backspace. Backspace is accessible via  though its function can be interchanged with the backspace key using a DIP switch, using this setting, the delete key is accessed via 
 The meta keys are located between the space bar and the alt keys.

On the far side of the keyboard there are DIP switches. These may be used to:
 Swap the alt and meta keys.
 Enable/disable downstream USB ports on USB models.
Set the OS
Enable/disable power-saving mode on HHKB Hybrid models

Its size is roughly half the size of DIN A4 paper.

Model overview 
Model names with JP denote a Japanese layout variant.

See also 

 List of mechanical keyboards
 Das Keyboard
 FrogPad
 Optimus Maximus keyboard
 Model M keyboard
 Space-cadet keyboard

References

External links 
 HHKB firmware, tools and manuals
 Eiiti Wada Mechanical Keyboard Community Interview
 Verge celebrates the Happy Hacking Keyboard as a status symbol
 engadget review of the Happy Hacking Keyboard Lite 2
 Linux Journal review of the Happy Hacking Keyboard Professional
 Review & spec of the Happy Hacking Keyboard Pro 2
 Linux Journal review of the original Happy Hacking Keyboard

Computer keyboard models